Sulzburg is a town in the district Breisgau-Hochschwarzwald, in Baden-Württemberg, Germany. It is situated on the western slope of the Black Forest, 20 km southwest of Freiburg.

Sulzburg had a long tradition of continuous Jewish settlement since medieval times. Around 1850 almost one third of its population of around 1200 was Jewish.
Sulzburg's lovely, barrel-vaulted synagogue has been completely restored. There exists an old Jewish cemetery near the town.

Sons and daughters of the city 

 1594 Frederick V, Margrave of Baden-Durlach, Markgraf of Baden-Durlach (1622-1659)
 1694 Johann Daniel Schöpflin, professor of history, eloquence and the theory of law at the University of Strasbourg
 1808 Gustav Weil, † 1889 in Freiburg im Breisgau, first orientalist, first Jewish professor in Germany
 1843 Ernst Leitz, † 1920 in Solothurn, founder of the  Ernst Leitz Optical Works Wetzlar
 1925, Erich Bloch, † 2016 in Washington, computer scientist and engineer, director of the American National Science Foundation,

References

External links 

 pictures & history

See also
Sulzberg

Breisgau-Hochschwarzwald
Baden